Strzelno  is a village in the administrative district of Gmina Puck, within Puck County, Pomeranian Voivodeship, in northern Poland. It is located within the ethnocultural region of Kashubia in the historic region of Pomerania.

The village has a population of 1,063.

Strzelno was a royal village of the Polish Crown, administratively located in the Puck County in the Pomeranian Voivodeship.

References

Villages in Puck County